Goolwa Airport  is an airport located in Goolwa, South Australia  northwest of the town centre. The facility is primarily used for recreational flying and general aviation. The airport hosts the Goolwa Classic Air Show, the biggest non-military air show in South Australia.

Runway
Goolwa Airport has three runways:
 Runway 01/19  Bitumen
 Runway 09/27  Grass
 Runway 16/34  Grass

Flying school 
The airfield is the site for RA-Aus flight training school approved by the Recreational Aviation Australia.

See also
 List of airports in South Australia

References

External links
Goolwa Airport S.A. website
flyingonline.biz RA-Aus Flight Training Facility

Airports in South Australia
RA-Aus Approved Flight Training Facilities